Nappan is a community in the Canadian province of Nova Scotia, located in  Cumberland County. It is home to Chignecto National Wildlife Area.

References
Nappan on Destination Nova Scotia

Communities in Cumberland County, Nova Scotia
General Service Areas in Nova Scotia